Fritz Bennicke Hart (11 February 1874 – 9 July 1949) was an English composer, conductor, teacher and unpublished novelist, who spent considerable periods in Australia and Hawaii.

Early life
Hart was born at Brockley, Greenwich, England, eldest child of Frederick Robinson Hart and his wife Jemima (Jemmima) Waters, née Bennicke. Both his parents were musical.  From the age of six, Fritz sang in the parish choir his father ran, and his mother was a piano teacher.   He spent three years as a chorister at Westminster Abbey, under Sir Frederick Bridge, and then went to the Royal College of Music in 1893, where he became acquainted with Gustav Holst, Samuel Coleridge-Taylor, William Hurlstone, Ralph Vaughan Williams and John Ireland. At one student concert in 1896, Hart played the cymbals, Vaughan Williams the triangle, Holst the trombone, and Ireland also played.  Composition was not one of Hart's subjects at the RCM, but he nevertheless came under the influence of Charles Villiers Stanford.

Hart toured with a theatre company, during which time he wrote incidental music for Julius Caesar.  He also wrote music for Romeo and Juliet, which he conducted himself.  He then worked for various touring companies, which gave him exposure to operettas, musical comedy, dramatic incidental music and opera.  He married in 1904, and his first child was born the following year.

Australia
Hart sailed to Australia aboard R.M.S. China in May 1909, as part of a company contracted by J. C. Williamson's to play the operetta King of Cadonia. The initial contract for 12 months was extended to four years. In 1913 Hart and Alfred Hill founded the short-lived Australian Opera League. The first programme, on 3 August 1914, included the first performance of Hart's opera Pierrette.

In 1913 Hart took over George Marshall-Hall's lecturing duties at the Melbourne Conservatorium of Music in Albert Street, Marshall-Hall having left for London. When a year later Marshall-Hall sent instruction that the Conservatorium was to be closed down, its staff refused to resign and appointed Hart director. Marshall-Hall was subsequently appointed professor of music at the University of Melbourne in 1915, so appearing as a potential rival to Hart's Conservatorium; but such was the anti-German/pro-British attitude during World War I that Marshall-Hall's predominantly German staff did not enjoy the popularity of Hart's more British orientated Conservatorium. Dame Nellie Melba established her school of singing there, and she and her pupils helped shape Hart's work as a composer.  He had the overall responsibility for her students' musical training, many of whom made their marks internationally.

In 1924 Hart was made a Fellow of the Royal College of Music. In 1927 he became acting conductor for the Melbourne Symphony Orchestra (MSO), and in 1928, after the death of Alberto Zelman, the permanent conductor. In 1932 the Melbourne University Conservatorium Orchestra and the MSO amalgamated under the joint conductorship of Hart and Bernard Heinze.  In 1929 the MSO was the first Australian orchestra to play open-air concerts.  These were in Melbourne's Alexandra Gardens, under the baton of Hart. These 'Popular Concerts' were made possible through a donation by Sidney Myer. Hart was highly regarded as a teacher, his pupils including Peggy Glanville-Hicks, Margaret Sutherland and Robert Hughes.

After 1937 Hart returned to Melbourne only once, for the jubilee of the Albert Street conservatorium in July 1945 when he conducted several of his works.

His portrait was painted by, among other artists, Max Meldrum and is the National Gallery of Australia's collection. The National Library of Australia has another portrait, by A. D. Colquhoun.

Hawaii
In December 1931 Hart was invited to be guest conductor of the Honolulu Symphony Orchestra. He returned annually, remaining there from December to April. Hart's wife died in 1935 and in September 1937 he married an American, Marvel Allison. In 1937 he became permanent conductor of the Honolulu Symphony Orchestra and first professor of music at the University of Hawaii, a position he retained until his retirement in 1942.  He remained conductor of the Symphony Orchestra until his death.

Hart died on 9 July 1949 at Honolulu of cardiac disorder and was cremated, survived by his son and his second wife.

Music
Hart excelled in writing for voices.  He wrote 23 operas, of which 18 were composed in Melbourne and 4 in Hawaii.  Seven of these were staged in his lifetime in Australia; none appear to have been staged in Britain.  He was interested in the writers of the Celtic Twilight, and used librettos by W. B. Yeats, J. M. Synge, Augusta Gregory, and George Russell (AE).  He also set texts by Shakespeare, Edmond Rostand, Molière, Edwin Arlington Robinson, and the Bible.

He wrote 514 songs, of which about half were composed in Melbourne and a quarter each in England and Hawaii; four large choral works, unaccompanied choruses, and part-songs.  He was deeply attached to the poetry of Robert Herrick, and set his words 126 times. His choral works used texts by Shelley and Walt Whitman.

He also wrote a symphony (1934), 14 other orchestral works, numerous chamber and solo instrumental works including 2 string quartets and 3 violin sonatas, transcriptions and arrangements.

Selected operas:
 The Land of Heart's Desire (1914)
 Riders to the Sea (1915)
 Deirdre of the Sorrows (1916)
 Ruth and Naomi (1917, Melbourne)
 Malvolio (1918, Melbourne)
 The Fantasticks (1919, Melbourne)
 Deirdre in Exile (1926, Melbourne)
 The Woman who Laughed at Faery (1929, Melbourne)
 St George and the Dragon (1931, Melbourne)
 Even Unto Bethlehem (1943, Honolulu).

Choral works:
 New Year's Eve
 Salve Caput Cruentatum (1925)
 O Gloriosa Domina (1925)
 Natural Magic
 Joll's Credo (1934).
Source: Grove Dictionary of Music and Musicians

Writing
In his student days at the Royal College of Music, Hart wrote verse, some of which was set to music by Gustav Holst (the unpublished operas The Revoke (1895) and The Idea (1898); partsong Light leaves whisper (1896), and children's chorus Clouds o'er the summer sky (1898)).

In Melbourne, his volume of verse Appassionata: Songs of Youth and Love was published by Lothian Press. While in Hawaii he wrote 23 novels, none of which were published.

References

External links
 Fritz Hart Collection, in the Performing Arts Collection, at Arts Centre Melbourne.

Sources
ADB: Fritz Hart
NLA: Papers of Fritz Hart
Grove's Dictionary of Music and Musicians, 5th. Ed.
Tregear, Peter. 'Fritz Bennicke Hart: An Introduction to his Life and Works', M.A. Thesis, University of Melbourne, 1993.

1874 births
1949 deaths
Australian opera composers
English composers
English classical musicians
People from Brockley
Choristers at Westminster Abbey
Musicians from Kent
British expatriates in Australia
British expatriates in the United States